Perumathur is a village in India. For administrative purposes, Perumathur is divided into three sub-villages: Milaganatham, Nallur (originally named Pallakadu), and Perumathur Kudikadu.

Demographics
At the time of the 2001 Indian census, Perumathur had a population of 3,416 people, with 1,644 males and 1,772 females.

As of 2001, Perumathur had an average literacy rate of 58 percent, which was higher than the national average of 51.5 percent. The literacy rate was 57 percent for men and 33 percent for women. It was reported that approximately 12 percent of the population was under the age of 6.

Nearby villages
Villages located near Perumathur (in order of increasing distance) are Sirumathur (1.9 km), Eraiyur (4 km), Pennakonam (4.5 km), Nannai (4.6 km), Eraiyur (5.1 km), and Paravai (5.9 km). Other nearby towns are Veppur (6.5 km), Thungapuram (12 km), Perambalur (19.4 km), Alathur (20.1 km), and Veppanthattai (21.6 km).

Climate

The temperature is moderate, with the maximum and minimum temperatures averaging 37 °C and 22 °C respectively. The village gets its rainfall from the northeast monsoon and the southwest monsoon. The average annual rainfall is 1,060 mm.

Temples

 Lord Shiva temple
 Krishna Temple
 Selliyamman Kovil
 Maariyamman temple
 Perumal temple
 Ayyanar temple
 Velaiyar Swamigal Jeeva Samadhi

Churches
Perumathur belongs to the Eraiyur parish. Perumathur, Poonagaram, Milakainatham, Nellore and Keelapuliur are its substations.

There are chapels in Perumathur and Poonagaram villages.

Education
Colleges near Perumathur:

 Srinivasan Engineering College.
 Thanthai Roever College of Nursing.
 Modern Arts and Science College.
 Bharathidhasan University College of Women in Veppur.
 Dhanalakshmi Srinivasan Medical College and Hospital.
 Roever Engineering College.

Schools near Perumathur:
 Government Higher Secondary School.
 St. John's High School, Permathur.
 Nehru Higher Secondary School, Eraiyur.
 St. Mary's R.C. School, Eraiyur.

Economy
Agriculture is the backbone of Perumathur's economy.

References

External links

Villages in Perambalur district